Lian Xiao (born 8 April 1994) is a Chinese professional go player. As of January 2017, he is ranking 5th in Chinese Weiqi Association official ratings with and Elo rating of 2660. Lian was promoted to 8 dan on 16 January 2017, and 9 dan in October 2017.

Promotion record

Career record

Titles and runners-up
 
Tied for #10 in total number of individual titles in China.

Head-to-head record vs selected players

Players who have won international Go titles in bold.

 Mi Yuting 13:9
 Zhou Ruiyang 12:8
 Chen Yaoye 10:8
 Fan Tingyu 7:8
 Ke Jie 4:7
 Tuo Jiaxi 4:7
 Yang Dingxin 8:2
 Fan Yunruo 7:3
 Cai Jing 6:4
 Shi Yue 5:5
 Li Qincheng 7:2
 Liu Xing 6:3
 Peng Liyao 4:5
 Tang Weixing 3:6
 Gu Li 6:2
 Tao Xinran 4:4
 Kim Jiseok 6:1
 Tong Mengcheng 5:2
 Liao Xingwen 5:2
 Huang Yunsong 4:3
 Meng Tailing 4:3
 Zhou Hexi 4:3
 Gu Lingyi 2:5
 Niu Yutian 5:1

References

1994 births
Living people
Chinese Go players